McNair-Wilson is a double-barrelled surname. It is also a political family in the United Kingdom.

List of people with the surname 

 Laura Farris née McNair-Wilson (born 1978), British Member of Parliament for Newbury (2019–present)
 Patrick McNair-Wilson (born 1929), British Member of Parliament for Lewisham West (1964–1966) and New Forest (1968–1997)
 Michael McNair-Wilson (1930 – 28 March 1993), British Member of Parliament for Walthamstow East (1969–1974)
 Robert McNair Wilson (1882–1963), British surgeon, writer and journalist and politician

See also 

 List of political families in the United Kingdom
 McNair
 Wilson (name)
 MacNair

Surnames
Political families of the United Kingdom
English-language surnames
Scottish surnames
Surnames of English origin
Surnames of Scottish origin
Surnames of British Isles origin
Compound surnames